Woorut, New South Wales is  a bounded rural locality of Warrumbungle Shire and a civil parish of Gowen County, New South Wales.

The parish is on the Castlereagh River.

The northern part of the Parish in Warrumbungle National Park.  Woorut Parish is near the Siding Spring Observatory.

References

Localities in New South Wales
Geography of New South Wales
Central West (New South Wales)